Fluorescein is used to help in the diagnosis of a number of eye problems. When applied as a drop or within a strip of paper to the surface of the eye it is used to help detect eye injuries such as foreign bodies and corneal abrasions. When given by mouth or injection into a vein it is used to help evaluate the blood vessels in the back of the eye during fluorescein angiography.

When applied to the surface of the eye, side effects may include a brief period of blurry vision and discoloration of contact lenses of the soft type. When used by mouth or injection, side effects may include headache, nausea, and a change to the color of the skin for a brief period of time. Allergic reactions may rarely occur. Fluorescein is a dye which is taken up by damaged cornea such that the area appears green under cobalt blue light. There is also a version that comes premixed with lidocaine.

Fluorescein was first made in 1871. It is on the World Health Organization's List of Essential Medicines.

Brand names
It is also sold as a combination drug with oxybuprocaine under the brand name Altafluor Benox.

Other animals
It is also sometimes administered to pets in multi-pet environments to determine which pet needs behavioral modification.

References

External links
 
 

World Health Organization essential medicines
Wikipedia medicine articles ready to translate